Pablo Cuevas and Guillermo Durán were the defending champions, but chose not to participate this year.

Roman Jebavý and Andrés Molteni won the title, defeating Daniele Bracciali and Federico Delbonis in the final, 6–2, 6–4.

Seeds

Draw

Draw

References

External links
 Main Draw

Generali Open Kitzbühel - Doubles
2018 Doubles